Nozze istriane (An Istrian wedding) is an opera in three acts by Antonio Smareglia to an Italian libretto by Luigi Illica. It premiered on 28 March 1895 at the Teatro Comunale in Trieste.

Roles

Synopsis
Time: 1895
Place: The village of Dignano 
 
Marussa and Lorenzo, two young villagers, are in love. However, a more wealthy suitor, Nicola, has said that he would waive a dowry. Marussa's miserly father, Menico, is  convinced by the village fiddler, Biagio, to marry her off to Nicola. Marussa is tricked into believing that Lorenzo has been unfaithful, and her wedding to Nicola is quickly arranged. In her room, shortly before the wedding, Marussa begs Nicola to release her from their engagement. Nicola refuses, and Lorenzo (who had been hiding behind the curtains), leaps out and attacks Nicola with a knife. During the fight, Nicola stabs Lorenzo, who dies in Marussa's arms.

Recording
Antonio Smareglia: Nozze istriane – Ian Storey (tenor), Katia Lytting (mezzo-soprano), Svetla Vassileva (soprano), Enzo Capuano (baritone), Giorgio Surjan (bass), Alberto Mastromarino (baritone); Teatro Verdi di Trieste Orchestra and Chorus; Tiziano Severini (conductor). Live performance recording from the Teatro Lirico Giuseppe Verdi, December 1999. Label: Bongiovanni BGV 2265 king

Notes

References
Ashbrook, William, Nozze istriane (review), The Opera Quarterly, Volume 18, Number 3, Summer 2002, pp. 434–436. Accessed via subscription 2 May 2009.

Sadie, Stanley (ed.), "Nozze istriane", The New Grove Dictionary of Opera, Macmillan Press, 1992, Vol 1, p. 635. 
Siff, Ira, "Smareglia: Nozze Istriane" Opera News, November 2001. Accessed via subscription 2 May 2009.

External links
Libretto (in Italian)

Operas
Italian-language operas
1895 operas
Operas by Antonio Smareglia